Miguel Peña may refer to:

Miguel Peña (politician)  (1781–1833), Venezuelan politician
Miguel Peña (runner) (1897–?), Spanish distance runner

See also
Miguel Peña Parish, area in Venezuela